Dystos (Latin: Dystus) is the name of a lake, village and former municipality in Euboea, Greece. Since the 2011 local government reform it is part of the municipality Kymi-Aliveri, of which it is a municipal unit. The municipal unit has an area of 162.431 km2. The seat of the municipality was Krieza.

History

The ancient town Dystus was mentioned by the 4th century BCE historian Theopompus. It is thought to have been founded by the Dryopians.
During the 1950s, the power corporation of Greece established a steam power plant close to the lake Dystos at the city of Aliveri. That power plant used lake water for the cooling system.

Historical population

References

External links 
Δήμος Δυστίων της Ευβοίας

Populated places in Euboea